Susan Greaney  is a British archaeologist specialising in the study of British prehistory. She is a senior properties historian with English Heritage. She was elected as a Fellow of the Society of Antiquaries of London on 27 June 2019.

Greaney earned a BA in Archaeology and Prehistory from University of Sheffield and a MSc in Professional Archaeology from University of Oxford. She is currently a part-time PhD student at Cardiff University in addition to her work at English Heritage.

In 2019, Greaney was appointed one of the BBC/AHRC New Generation Thinkers.

Select publications

Westlake, S. 2006. "Routeways and waterways: the Neolithic-Bronze Age rock carvings of the Dingle peninsula in south-west Ireland from a landscape perspective", Archaeological Journal 162, 1-30.
Westlake, S. and Barnard, S. 2008. "Free sites unlocked: facing the challenges at free and unstaffed properties", Conservation Bulletin 58, 35.
Westlake, S. 2009. "A pyramid in England: Silbury Hill, Wiltshire", Country Life 203(2), 40-42.
Greaney, S. 2013. "Reconstruction drawings: illustrating the evidence", In Mills, N. Presenting the Romans: Interpreting the Frontiers of the Roman Empire World Heritage Site. Woodbridge: Boydell Press. 310-39.
Greaney, S. 2013. Set in Stone: How our ancestors saw Stonehenge. London: English Heritage/Scala Publishing.

References

British women archaeologists
British archaeologists
Fellows of the Society of Antiquaries of London
21st-century archaeologists
Year of birth missing (living people)
Living people
21st-century British women writers
Alumni of the University of Oxford
Alumni of the University of Sheffield